Edward Nash Hurley (July 31, 1864 – November 14, 1933) was an Irish American businessman and inventor who served as the second chairman of the Federal Trade Commission from July 1, 1916 to January 31, 1917.

Biography
Hurley was born in Galesburg, Illinois on July 31, 1864. He finished high school at 17 and went to work for the railroad, ascending from shopman to engineer, and eventually becoming assistant to the president of the Brotherhood of Locomotive Engineers and Trainmen.  In 1897 he started producing pneumatic tools together with a couple of brothers and made $125,00 selling the British patent. In 1907 he became president of the National Bank of Wheaton and then founded the Hurley Machine Company, which produced vacuum cleaners and washing and ironing machines. In 1914 he was named to the Federal Trade Commission and in 1915 he became its chairman. Hurley also served on the Red Cross War Council, the War Trade Board, and as chairman of the U.S. Shipping Board.

He helped professor T. G. Masaryk in a question of Czechoslovak legions and a foundation of a Czechoslovak state in 1918.

In 1918 with Professor Robert DeLoach  he joined the Vagabonds, a group consisting of John Burroughs, Thomas Edison, Henry Ford and Harvey Firestone who made a camping trip to the Appalachian mountains.

In 1926 he received the Laetare Medal and in 1933 he donated $200,000 to the University of Notre Dame for a new building for the college, which was named Hurley Hall.

Death
He died in Chicago on November 14, 1933. He is buried at Calvary Cemetery in Evanston.

Works

References

1864 births
1933 deaths
Federal Trade Commission personnel
People from Galesburg, Illinois
Recipients of the Distinguished Service Medal (US Army)
Laetare Medal recipients
Woodrow Wilson administration personnel
Burials at Calvary Cemetery (Evanston, Illinois)